Sádaba (in Aragonese: Sadaba) is a municipality located in the province of Zaragoza, Aragon, Spain. 

Sights include the ancient Roman Mausoleum of the Atilii and the Sádaba Castle.

References

External links
 Official Website

Municipalities in the Province of Zaragoza